The 2017 American Athletic Conference baseball tournament was held at Spectrum Field in Clearwater, Florida, from May 23 through 28. The event, held at the end of the conference regular season, determines the champion of the American Athletic Conference for the 2017 season. The winner of the double-elimination tournament will receive the conference's automatic bid to the 2017 NCAA Division I baseball tournament.

Format and seeding
All eight baseball teams in The American will be seeded based on their records in conference play.  The tournament will use a two bracket double-elimination format, leading to a single championship game between the winners of each bracket.

Bracket

References

Tournament
American Athletic Conference Baseball Tournament
Baseball competitions in Florida
American Athletic Conference baseball tournament
American Athletic Conference baseball tournament
College sports tournaments in Florida